Shraddha Nigam is an Indian film and television actress.

Personal life

In 2008, Shraddha married television actor Karan Singh Grover. They divorced 10 months later following reports of his affair with choreographer Nicole Alvarez. In 2012, she married Mayank Anand; the couple have jointly owned a fashion line, MASN, since 2011.

Career
Shraddha's film debut was Poonilamazha, a 1997 Malayalam film. Her Hindi debut was in Josh in 2000. She later acted in few Hindi films. Her TV debut was the serial Choodiyan. The Times of India wrote that her role as the female lead in Krishna Arjun "stole hearts". In 2010, Shraddha began to focus on her fashion design line. In 2012, she was offered a role opposite Anuj Saxena in a show produced by Bhairavi Raichura.

Filmography

Films 
 Apne Dam Par (1996)
 Poonilamazha (1997) 
 Josh (2000) ... Prakash Sharma's girlfriend
 Aaghaaz (2000) ... Ratna
 Aazad (Telugu Movie) (2000) ... Only Song
 The Truth ... Yathharth (2002)
 Athade Oka Sainyam (2004) ... Champa
 Partition (2007) ... Manjula
 Say Salaam India (2007)
 Jack N Jhol (2008) ... Pammy
 Lahore (2010) ... Neela Chaudhary

Television 
 Choodiyan ... Rushali
 Krishna Arjun ... Detective Krishna
 Kahaani Ghar Ghar Kii
 Thodi Si Zameen Thoda Sa Aasmaan
 Dekho Magar Pyaar Se ... Nikita Malhotra
 Tu Kahe Agar 
 Pyaar Ishq Mohabbat
 Rangbarangi
 Saathiya
 Mano Ya Naa Mano
 Jeena Isi Ka Naam Hai ... as a friend of Hussain Kuwajerwala
 Filmy Cocktail (Host)
 The Best of Sa Re Ga Ma Pa Challenge 2007 (Host)
 Nach Baliye 3 ... performance in one episode with Karan Singh Grover
 Shree Adi Manav ... special appearance in first two episodes as Karishma
 Crime Patrol ... Aruna Shanbaug
 Kalakarz (Host)

References

External links

Year of birth missing (living people)
Living people
Indian television actresses
Indian film actresses
Actresses in Hindi cinema
Indian women television presenters
Indian television presenters
Actresses from Indore
Actresses in Hindi television
20th-century Indian actresses
21st-century Indian actresses
Actresses in Malayalam cinema